Skantzoura is an island in the Sporades archipelago, Greece. , it had no resident population. Skantzoura is in Zone B of the Alonnisos Marine Park.

Anciently, the island was called Scandira or Skandeira and Scandila.

References

External links
Skantzoura on GTP Travel Pages 

Landforms of the Sporades
Islands of Thessaly
Populated places in the Sporades